Man, Woman and Sin (1927) is a silent film produced and distributed by Metro-Goldwyn-Mayer. The film was directed by Monta Bell and John Gilbert, and stars Gilbert and stage actress Jeanne Eagels in one of her rare film appearances. The film is obscure but survives complete, but has yet to be released on VHS or DVD.

Cast
John Gilbert - Al Whitcomb
Jeanne Eagels - Vera Worth
Gladys Brockwell - Mrs. Whitcomb
Marc McDermott - Bancroft
Philip Anderson - Al Whitcomb (as a child)
Hayden Stevenson - reporter
Charles K. French - editor

Plot synopsis
Albert Whitcomb (Gilbert) is devoted to his mother (Brockwell). He lands a job as a cub reporter at a newspaper and becomes romantically entangled with the society editor, Vera Worth (Eagels). However, he does not realize that she is the mistress of the paper's owner, Bancroft (McDermott).

References

External links
Man, Woman and Sin at IMDB
Man, Woman and Sin at SilentEra
synopsis Man, Woman and Sin at AllMovie
 Lobby card for Man, Woman and Sin

1927 films
American silent feature films
Films directed by Monta Bell
Metro-Goldwyn-Mayer films
1927 drama films
Silent American drama films
American black-and-white films
1920s American films